Crime in a Music Hall is a 1968 Czechoslovak comedy film directed by Jiří Menzel.

External links
 

1968 comedy films
1968 films
Czechoslovak comedy films
Films directed by Jiří Menzel
Czech comedy films
1960s Czech films